Henry de Beaumont may refer to:

Henry de Beaumont, 1st Earl of Warwick (died 1123) 
Henry de Beaumont, 5th Earl of Warwick (died 1229) 
Henry de Beaumont (died 1340), 4th Earl of Buchan (jure uxoris) and 1st Baron Beaumont

See also
Henry Beaumont (disambiguation)
Harry Beaumont, American film director